Berwick is a small farming community on the banks of the Waipori River in Clutha District, New Zealand. To the south of Berwick is the Berwick Forest, a large pine plantation.

Berwick is also the location of one of the Otago Youth Adventure Trust's campsites.

It is unclear which Berwick the community is named after, but the leading candidate is Berwick-upon-Tweed in Northumberland.

References

Populated places in Otago